Science Hill is a planning precinct of the Yale University campus primarily devoted to physical and biological sciences. It is located in the Prospect Hill neighborhood of New Haven, Connecticut.

Originally a 36-acre residential estate known as Sachem's Wood, it was purchased by the university in 1910 as a land bank. Removed from the main campus and close to the former Sheffield Scientific School, the hill was allocated to large science laboratories and the main buildings of the Yale School of Forestry & Environmental Studies. Several laboratory buildings were completed in the 1910s, but most of the campus was completed during the build-up of scientific research after World War II.

Geography 

The topography of present-day Science Hill was primarily formed during the Wisconsinan glaciation. The Laurentide Ice Sheet flattened the soft sandstone of New Haven Harbor but had less effect on its surrounding, hard trap rock formations like East Rock and West Rock. Science Hill is a portion of a sandstone drumlin that was sheltered from glacial erosion by a traprock ridge, Mill Rock, to its north.

History

Sachem's Wood estate (1784–1910)

The Science Hill site is not known to be inhabited until 1784, when it was purchased by James Hillhouse, New Haven's largest landowner. Hillhouse built a wide road, now Hillhouse Avenue, to extend to the foot of the hill, but planned to use the ridge itself for his own residence, and called the tract "Temple Square." Hillhouse bequeathed the land to his son, James Abraham Hillhouse, who erected a family estate known as Sachem's Wood, a name derived from Hillhouse's supposedly Native American facial features. Hillhouse commissioned a secluded mansion, known by the same name and designed by Ithiel Town at the present-day site of Kline Biology Tower. After Sachem's Wood was completed in 1828, surrounding lots were developed into revivalist mansions, but the large Hillhouse tract remained an undivided estate.

Science education at Yale College came in 1802 with the appointment of Benjamin Silliman as professor of chemistry. Although Silliman was given a basement laboratory on Old Brick Row, sciences were marginal within the university's buildings and curriculum over the first half of the nineteenth century. In 1847, the Sheffield Scientific School was founded as a separate school of Yale, and it began expanding its campus between the university's main campus and Sachem's Wood. Although a corporate entity of the university, the school was socially and administratively segregated from the rest of Yale; Yale College students did not attend its classes, and Sheffield students lived in societies and dormitories separate from the undergraduate college. Over time, the division caused Yale's science education and research efforts to suffer.

Purchase by Yale and early growth (1910–1945)

By the turn of the 20th century, there were few large, undeveloped tracts of land near Yale's campus. The largest was Sachem's Wood, which a group of Yale alumni purchased from the Hillhouse family in 1905, hoping to give Yale room to expand. Seeking to build new science facilities and bring the Sheffield Scientific School under greater university control and strengthen university science research, Yale raised funds from Olivia Sage to purchase the estate in 1910, renaming it Pierson-Sage Square.  It was the largest single acquisition of land since Yale's founding, and the university drew up two early site plans for the property: a Frederick Law Olmsted site plan in 1905, and a university-wide master plan by John Russell Pope in 1919. Neither was comprehensively enacted, but elements of both are evident throughout the present-day site.

Shortly after the land acquisition, a gift was received from brothers Henry and William Sloane for a new physics laboratory. Within the decade, Yale built chemistry, zoology, and botany laboratories, and new buildings for the Forestry School, and Peabody Museum, all in the Gothic Revival style popular at Yale in the early 20th century. The new facilities allowed Yale to demolish its older science buildings on its central campus, including the original Peabody Museum and Sloane Physical Laboratory, making room for the residential college system. Meanwhile, the Sachem's Wood mansion, preserved for the Hillhouse family in the purchase agreement, was increasingly surrounded by large laboratory facilities. After the death of the last Hillhouse heir, Yale demolished the mansion in 1942.

Expansion of science facilities (1945–present)
After World War II, residential overcrowding and an influx of married students prompted Yale to build temporary quonset huts on undeveloped areas of Pierson-Sage Square. The advent of the "atomic age" prompted a second period of laboratory building. University president A. Whitney Griswold relied on modernist architects for these facilities, breaking with pre-war gothic fervor. He commissioned Paul Schweikher to design Gibbs Laboratory, and Eero Saarinen for Ingalls Rink, and Philip Johnson for the Kline Biology Tower, Chemistry Laboratory, and Geology Building. Like Olmsted and Rogers, Saarinen and Johnson were also called upon to improve the site plan; Saarinen's vision contributed modestly to the configuration, while Johnson's buildings gave Science Hill a central courtyard.

In 1966, the construction of Wright Nuclear Structure Laboratory (WNSL), named for Arthur W. Wright, allowed Yale to house the first emperor Van de Graaff particle accelerator. Once the most powerful accelerator of its type, it was decommissioned in 2011 as other particle research facilities became more useful to the field. In 2013, Karsten Heeger initiated a transformation of the WNSL accelerator facility into a state-of-the-art facility, research program, and community that is equipped to develop, build and use research instrumentation for experiments across the globe that investigate the invisible universe.  The new Wright Lab opened officially in a public opening ceremony on May 16, 2017.

At the end of the 20th century, Yale President Rick Levin announced a commitment to substantially increase investment in sciences and medicine. In the years following, the university has launched at least five major building and renovation projects, including new buildings for biology, chemistry, environmental science, and the Forestry School.

University organizations and departments 

The departments of the Graduate School of Arts and Sciences with facilities on Science Hill are: Astronomy; Chemistry; Ecology and Evolutionary Biology; Molecular Biophysics and Biochemistry; Molecular, Cellular and Developmental Biology; Geology & Geophysics; Physics, and Applied Physics. Some biology faculty have joint appointments in the Yale School of Medicine and have laboratory space within the medical campus.

Most offices and laboratories of the Yale School of Forestry are housed on Science Hill, with a few to its north at Marsh Hall. The school first came to Science Hill in 1924 with the completion of Sage Hall as its new main building. In 2008, the school opened Kroon Hall adjacent to Sage. The school also occupies several former mansions at the top of Science Hill.

Connecticut's largest natural history museum, the Peabody Museum of Natural History, relocated from downtown New Haven to the southeastern corner of Science Hill in 1925. The museum is Yale's main repository of scientific collections, including fossils, minerals, archeological artifacts, and animal specimens. As its collections have grown, they have been shifted among at least five science hill buildings, and are currently housed in the museum and the adjacent Kline Geology Laboratory and Environmental Science Center. The museum also hosts permanent and rotating exhibitions for visitors.

Two facilities of the Yale University Library are located on Science Hill. The Center for Science & Social Science Information, formerly the Kline Science Library, is housed in the lower levels of Kline Biology Tower, and a geology library resides in Kline Geology Laboratory.

The Yale Sustainable Food Project is housed in a mansion at the top of the hill and possesses a farm across the street.

Architecture and art 

The dominant architectural styles of Science Hill are Gothic revival and mid-century modernist. Later buildings, like the Environmental Science Center and the Bass Center, have attempted to harmonize these earlier styles. Several buildings are recognized as important architectural monuments, most notably Eero Saarinen's Ingalls Rink and Philip Johnson's Kline Biology Tower.

For most of its history, Science Hill has been criticized for its lack of site planning. Architectural historian Elizabeth Mills Brown appraised its 1960s incarnation as Yale's "most poorly integrated, inefficient, and incoherent complex," observing that undeveloped land had offered too much freedom to plan comprehensively. More recently, a campus plan commissioned by the university articulated similar concerns, calling the area "an ill-defined and unattractive pedestrian environment" lacking a "sense of place and focus." Since 2000, Yale has invested significant resources in improving buildings and connecting areas within Science Hill.

Several sculptures decorate the hillside. To commemorate his work to found the Sheffield Scientific School, a statue of Benjamin Silliman cast by John Ferguson Weir resides outside the Sterling Chemistry Laboratory. A Roy Lichtenstein sculpture entitled "Modern Head" was placed at the base of Science Hill, near Hillhouse Avenue, in 1993.

List of buildings

References

Further reading

External links 

Yale University
Buildings and structures in New Haven, Connecticut
Modernist architecture in Connecticut
Science parks in the United States